By-elections to the 13th Canadian Parliament were held to elect members of the House of Commons of Canada between the 1917 federal election and the 1921 federal election. Prime Minister Robert Borden, then Arthur Meighen, led a majority government consisting members collectively known as the Unionist Party, during the 13th Canadian Parliament.

The list includes Ministerial by-elections which occurred due to the requirement that Members of Parliament recontest their seats upon being appointed to Cabinet. These by-elections were almost always uncontested. This requirement was abolished in 1931.

See also
List of federal by-elections in Canada

Sources
 Parliament of Canada–Elected in By-Elections 

1921 elections in Canada
1920 elections in Canada
1919 elections in Canada
1918 elections in Canada
13th